Miss.Net d.o.o. Bihać is one of the leading cable television and broadband Internet service providers in Una-Sana Canton, Bosnia and Herzegovina. The company was founded in 2004 and its headquarters is located in Bihać.

Cable TV channel line-up
Miss.Net Company currently (February 2016) offers 61 TV channel via cable television in Bihać.

1 - Arena Sport 1 BiH
2 - Hayat Plus
3 - RTL Televizija
4 - Pink Reality
5 - TLC Balkans
6 - MTV Srbija
7 - BHT 1
8 - FTV
9 - Pink BH
10 - Test
11 - Hayat TV
12 - Televizija USK
13 - OBN
14 - Nova TV
15 - Pink BH
16 - Cartoon Network
17 - HRT 1 RTS Sat
18 - Eurosport 1
19 - HRT 2
20 - Discovery Channel Europe
21 - Animal Planet
22 - Pink Premium
23 - National Geographic Channel
24 - Arena Sport 4
25 - Viasat Explorer
26 - Arena Sport 3
27 - Pink Action
28 - Nat Geo Wild
29 - BN Televizija
30 - Pink Movies   
31 - CNN
32 - ID X 
33 - RTV Cazin
34 - DM Sat
35 - History Channel
36 - Balkanika TV
37 - Eurosport 2
38 - O Kanal
39 - RTL 2 HR
40 - TV Alfa
41 - RTCG
42 - B92 Info
43 - Pink Kids  
44 - OTV Valentino
45 - Hayat Folk
46 - VH1
47 - Pink Soap
48 - Al Jazeera Balkans
49 - Hayat Music
50 - Face TV
51 - Super RTL
52 - RTS Sat
53 - Pro 7
54 - Sat 1
55 - RTRS
56 - RTL
57 - RTL 2
58 - Radio Bir
59 - Universal Channel
60 - HRT 3
61 - Test / Service channel

References

External links
 Official website of MissNet Bihać (in Russian) (in Bosnian)

Communications in Bosnia and Herzegovina
Internet service providers of Bosnia and Herzegovina
Cable television companies
Internet service providers